Ankhesenpepi III was an ancient Egyptian queen of the Sixth Dynasty as a consort of Pepi II, who was probably her uncle. She was a daughter of Nemtyemsaf I and was named after her grandmother, Ankhesenpepi I.

Her titles included: King’s Wife (hmt-niswt), King’s Daughter (z3t-niswt).

Ankhesenpepi III was buried in a pyramid near that of her grandfather Pepi I. The main part of her sarcophagus was made of sandstone and embedded in the floor of the burial chamber. The lid of the sarcophagus was made of pink granite.

References

23rd-century BC women
22nd-century BC women
Queens consort of the Sixth Dynasty of Egypt
Pepi II Neferkare